Parachabora triangulifera is a moth of the family Noctuidae first described by George Hampson in 1901. It is found on Cuba.

References

Moths described in 1901
Calpinae
Endemic fauna of Cuba